Munin was a Swedish nanosatellite. It was launched on November 21, 2000 on a Delta II rocket from the Vandenberg Air Force Base in California, together with two other satellites. Munin was developed by the Swedish Institute of Space Physics in cooperation with students from Luleå University of Technology and Umeå University. Last contact was on February 12, 2001, after a manual CPU reset; failure was probably in the boot PROM.

General information 
 Dimensions
 Size: 213 x 213 x 218 (height) mm
 Mass: 
 Science
 Combined ion and electron spectrometer
 High energy particle detector
 Miniature CCD camera intended for auroral imaging
 Onboard computer
 CPU: Texas Instrument TMS320C50 at 
 RAM: 2 MByte

Elliptical polar orbit. Perigee: 698 km, apogee: 1800 km.

See also 

 Swedish National Space Board

References 

Official site
About the launch

Geospace monitoring satellites
Science and technology in Sweden
Space programme of Sweden
Spacecraft launched in 2000